Vårdklockan Church is a church in Visby, on the island of Gotland in Sweden. It belongs to the Protestant Uniting Church in Sweden.

References

Churches in Gotland County